Bonaccorsi is a surname. Notable people with the surname include:

 Antonino Bonaccorsi, Italian painter
 Arconovaldo Bonaccorsi, Italian Fascist soldier, politician and lawyer
 Lorenza Bonaccorsi, Italian politician
 Silvio Sergio Bonaccorsi Barbato, Italian-Brazilian opera conductor and composer

See also
 Aci Bonaccorsi, comune (municipality) in the Metropolitan City of Catania in the Italian region Sicily